Souleymane Démé (born 1986) is a Chadian actor. He is most notable for the critically acclaimed role in the film GriGris in which he played the titular role.

Filmography

References

External links
 

Living people
Chadian actors
1986 births